Ephorus or Ephoros (fl. 3rd century AD) of Kyme in Aeolia, in Asia Minor, was an ancient Greek historian in the Roman Empire during Late Antiquity. He is called "the Younger" to distinguish him from Ephorus, his earlier colleague from the same town.

Ephorus the Younger is mentioned only by Suda, according to which he wrote a history of Galienus in twenty-seven books, a work on Corinth, one on the Aleuadae, and a few others. The name Galienus in this account, it should be observed, is only a correction of Volaterranus, for the common reading in Suidas is Galênou.

Notes

References
 

3rd-century Greek people
3rd-century Romans
3rd-century historians
Greek-language historians from the Roman Empire
Aeolians
Historians from Roman Anatolia
Year of death unknown
Year of birth unknown